Ping Shan South is one of the 39 constituencies in the Yuen Long District of Hong Kong.

The constituency returns one district councillor to the Yuen Long District Council, with an election every four years. Ping Shan South constituency is loosely based on Arnold Gardens, Aster Court, Lam Hau Tsuen, Shan Ha Tsuen, Tai Tao Tsuen, Tan Kwai Garden, Tan Kwai Tsuen, The Woodsville, Tong Yan San Tsuen in Yuen Long with estimated population of 16,555.

Councillors represented

Election results

2010s

References

Ping Shan
Constituencies of Hong Kong
Constituencies of Yuen Long District Council
1999 establishments in Hong Kong
Constituencies established in 1999